The 2013 Duquesne Dukes football team represented Duquesne University in the 2013 NCAA Division I FCS football season. They were led by ninth year head coach Jerry Schmitt and played their home games at Arthur J. Rooney Athletic Field. They were a member of the Northeast Conference. They finished the season 7–4, 4–2 in NEC play to share the conference title with Sacred Heart. Due to their loss to Sacred Heart, they did not receive the conference's automatic playoff bid and did not receive an at-large bid.

Schedule

References

Duquesne
Duquesne Dukes football seasons
Northeast Conference football champion seasons
Duquesne Dukes football